The Department of Engineering Science is the engineering department of the University of Oxford. It is part of the university's Mathematical, Physical and Life Sciences Division. The department was ranked 3rd best institute in the UK for engineering in the 2021 Research Excellence Framework.

It is principally located on a triangular plot formed by Banbury Road to the west, Parks Road to the east and Keble Road to the south. The main building is the tall 1960s Thom Building that dominates the local landscape, especially the view from the University Parks to the east. Further lower buildings have been added to the north since then. The department shares buildings with the Department of Materials.

Buildings
The department is based in the Thom Building, built in 1960, which houses two main lectures theatres, four floors of teaching, research and technical support laboratories, core administration offices and a student study area. The adjacent array of four interconnected buildings house departmental professor and postgraduate research space, some of which is shared with the Department of Materials. The department also maintains satellite facilities in a number of locations throughout the city. This includes the Old Road Campus Building, which houses the Institute of Biomedical Engineering, the Southwell Building (the Oxford Thermofluids Institute), Eagle House (the Oxford Man Institute for Quantitative Finance), the George Building (the Oxford Robotics Institute), and Begbroke Science Park (the Institute for Advanced Technology building).

History

The department was originally established in 1908 with the appointment of the first Professor of Engineering Science at Oxford, Frewen Jenkin, grandfather of Lord Jenkin of Roding. The Jenkin Building is named after him. On 2 February 1909, the Honour School of Natural Science (Engineering Science) was formally instituted by a Statute of Oxford University. The School was initially located at 6 Keble Road, on the south side of what is now known as the Keble Road Triangle, part of the Oxford University Science Area. The main part of the department has remained and expanded at this location to the present day.

The Thom Building, built in 1963, is named after Alexander Thom (1894–1985), a Scottish engineer who was also a professor of engineering at Oxford. The adjacent Holder Building followed in 1976.

The department celebrated its Centenary in 2008 and Lord Jenkin acted as its Patron.

Spin-offs 
There have been approximately 40 spin-offs from research done in the Department of Engineering Science. These companies operate in the medical, biotech, energy, transport, instrumentation, materials, nanotech, optics, robotics, and information technology spaces. The list includes PowderJect Pharmaceuticals, YASA, OrganOx, First Light Fusion, Oxsonics, Oxbotica, Sensyne Health, OxVent, Mind Foundry and Opsydia.

Undergraduate study 
The intake of students into the department is between 160 and 170 annually. The department offers a general engineering course, where students only specialise in one of six areas in their third and fourth years of their Masters in Engineering degree (MEng). These specialisations are:

 Biomedical engineering
 Chemical engineering
 Civil engineering
 Electrical engineering
 Information engineering
 Mechanical engineering

Students can also choose to follow an Engineering, Entrepreneurship and Management (EEM) pathway in the third and fourth years of their degree. This option is taught in coordination with the Saïd Business School.

Graduate study and research 
The Department of Engineering Science carries out research in the following areas:

 Biomedical engineering
 Civil & offshore engineering
 Electrical & opto-electronic engineering
 Energy engineering
 Information, control & vision engineering
 Solid mechanics & materials engineering
 Thermo-fluids & turbomachinery
 Chemical and process engineering

The department is home to five research institutes:

 Oxford-Man Institute for Quantitative Finance (OMI) 
 Oxford e-Research Centre
 Oxford Thermofluids Institute
 Institute of Biomedical Engineering
 Oxford Robotics Institute

The research degrees offered by the department are MSc(R), DEng and DPhil. The department has approximately 500 postgraduate research students.

Research Evaluation

The department was ranked 3rd among UK engineering departments in 2021 Research Excellence Framework (REF), having previously ranked 1st in 2014.

Notable people

Fellows of the Royal Society

J. Michael Brady
Alison Noble
Philip Torr
Andrew Blake
Roberto Cipolla
Andrew Zisserman
 Brian Spalding
Frederick Charles Frank
Warren East, CEO of Rolls-Royce
Hugh F. Durrant-Whyte
Donal Bradley
Charles Frewen Jenkin
Richard Vynne Southwell
Derman Christopherson
 David Clarke
 Laszlo Solymar
 Ted Paige

Timoshenko Medal Recipients

Richard Vynne Southwell

 Heads of Department

 1908-1929: Charles Frewen Jenkin
1929-1942: Richard Vynne Southwell
1945-1961: Alexander Thom
1961-1977: Douglas William Holder
1979-1989: Charles Peter Wroth
1989-1994: J. Michael Brady
1994-1999: David Clarke
1999-2004: Rodney Eatock Taylor 
2004-2009: Richard Darton
2009–2014: Guy Houlsby
2014–2019: Lionel Tarassenko
2019–present: Ronald A. Roy

 Alumni and researchers who have made significant contributions

Rowan Atkinson, actor, comedian, and screenwriter
 Brian Bellhouse, founder of PowderJect
 Donal Bradley, pioneer in molecular electronic materials
 Brian Spalding, a founder of computational fluid dynamics.  
Constantin Cousssios, distinguished professor in biomedical engineering
 Hugh F. Durrant-Whyte, known for probabilistic methods for robotics
Warren East, CEO of Rolls-Royce Holdings
Frederick Charles Frank, theoretical physicist
Shaukat Hameed Khan, optical physicist
Paul Newman (engineer), founder of Oxbotica
Alison Noble, medical imaging researcher and first female Statutory Professor in Engineering at Oxford
Janet Pierrehumbert, National Academy of Sciences, ISCA Medal for Scientific Achievement 2020
Eleanor Stride, pioneer in drug delivery systems, Blavatnik Award for Young Scientists
Anne Trefethen, computer scientist and professor of high-performance computing
Andrew Zisserman, visionary pioneer in computer vision
Leslie Fox, mathematician, doctorate student of Richard Vynne Southwell. 
Bill Bradfield, aviation engineer, and recipient of Edward Warner Award.
Ann Nicholson, Dean in the Faculty of Information Technology of Monash University.

See also
Oxford Robotics Institute
Department of Materials, University of Oxford
Department of Physics, University of Oxford
 Glossary of engineering
Oxford Instruments
 Department of Engineering, University of Cambridge

References

External links
 Department of Engineering Science website
 Oxford University Engineering Society
 Society of Oxford University Engineers — the alumni society for Oxford engineering graduates
 SOUE News: One Hundred Years of Engineering Science at Oxford, 1908-2008

1908 establishments in England
Educational institutions established in 1908
Engineering
Oxford